L'Absie is a commune in the Deux-Sèvres department in the Nouvelle-Aquitaine region in western France.

L'Absie is centred on the remains of a medieval abbey patronised by Eleanor of Aquitaine. L'Absie is also near the Vendée border, about an hour's drive from the sunny sandy beaches of the Atlantic coast.

Population

See also
Communes of the Deux-Sèvres department

References

Communes of Deux-Sèvres